Glaucus marginatus is a species of small, floating, blue sea slug; a pelagic (open-ocean) aeolid nudibranch; a marine opisthobranch gastropod mollusc in the family Glaucidae. This species is closely related to Glaucus atlanticus, and is part of a species complex (Informal clade Marginatus) along with Glaucus bennettae, Glaucus thompsoni, and Glaucus mcfarlanei. Like Glaucus atlanticus, it is commonly known as a blue dragon.

Description
This nudibranch is dark blue, and in many ways it resembles a smaller version of Glaucus atlanticus. However, in this species the cerata are arranged in a single row in each arch.

The species has a light and dark blue foot.

Distribution
This species is pelagic, and can be found in the Pacific Ocean.

While they do not usually inhabit coastal regions, hundreds of the creatures were observed washing up on one of the Sydney North Shore beaches, near Long Reef, in February 2021.

Habitat and behaviour
These small nudibranches float upside down on the surface tension in temperate and tropical seas. They eat colonial cnidarians such as the Portuguese man o' war (aka bluebottle, or Physalia utriculus),  blue buttons (Porpita porpita), and the by-the-wind sailor (Velella velella).

References

Sources
 Bergh, L.S.R. (1860). Om Forekomsten af Neldefiim hos Mollusker. Vidensk. Meddel. Naturh. Foren. Kjöbenhavn, p. 309-331, pl. 8.
  Burn R. (2006) A checklist and bibliography of the Opisthobranchia (Mollusca: Gastropoda) of Victoria and the Bass Strait area, south-eastern Australia. Museum Victoria Science Reports 10:1–42.
  Australian Museum Online sections - sea slug forums

External links

Glaucidae
Gastropods described in 1864